Uncial 0297 (in the Gregory-Aland numbering), is a Greek uncial manuscript of the New Testament. Palaeographically it has been assigned to the 9th century.

Description 

The codex contains a small parts of the Gospel of Matthew, on 2 parchment leaves. The text is written in two columns per page, 25 lines per page, in uncial letters.

It is a palimpsest, the upper text contains the menaion.

Currently it is dated by the INTF to the 9th century.

Contents 

The codex contains: Matthew 1:1-14; 5:3-19.

Location 

Currently the codex is housed at the British Library (Additional Manuscripts 31919, fol. 105, 108) in London.

See also 

 List of New Testament uncials
 Textual criticism

References 

Greek New Testament uncials
Palimpsests
9th-century biblical manuscripts